Martiros Manoukian  (born August 5, 1947) is a contemporary mixed-media artist known for his unique genre of paintings categorized as Marmillism (Martiros Millennial-ism).

Early life and education
Born in Yerevan, the capital of Armenia, Martiros’ extraordinary abilities as an artist became evident in early childhood. At age 11, the young painter was included in an art exhibition in Moscow for aspiring high school painters, for which he won first prize. From then on, Martiros continued to create masterpieces, until age 16 when he exhibited a full collection of his pieces at the Avant-Garde Youth Expo. His piece Girl Of My Dreams, was awarded first place and brought him critical acclaim from his mentor Martiros Saryan.

In 1967, Martiros was admitted to the State Academy of Fine Arts of Armenia and graduated in 1972.

Career
Martiros is regarded in the international art space as breaking through the limitations imposed by the artistic world. By painting on fabrics with combinations of watercolors, acrylics, oil and mixed metals, he is respected as a genius of fantasy with elements of Realism and Impressionism, creating artworks depicting portraits, abstract motifs and wondrous landscapes mostly influenced by nature and women.

Manoukian has exhibited throughout the world including Armenia, Switzerland, Russia, Japan, Hong Kong and in the United States. His paintings are regarded as collectible pieces and have sold for exorbitant prices around the world. Through the years, Martiros has sold unique original works in Hong Kong, Switzerland Japan or via private sales through his representative Bella Haykoff.

Military period
Martiros did everything in his power to avoid mandatory military service until his graduation from the State Academy of Fine Arts of Armenia in 1972. But he was forced to enlist in 1973. He served two years, painting for the regime and showing his pieces at various military art exhibitions.

Russian period
Martiros’ first public art showing happened in 1972 in Yerevan, at the Artists’ Association of the USSR exhibition. He was granted membership to the very selective and influential Union of Soviet Artists at a very young age.  He participated in several exhibitions under the patronage of the Artists’ Union. These shows took place in Yerevan and Moscow between 1974-1986, in Kostroma 1977, Suzdal 1979, Ivanovo 1984, as well as Kiev in 1980 and Leningrad (now known as Saint Petersburg) in 1983.

During these years, Martiros enjoyed national acclaim for his work, winning the first prize at the “Thirty Years After World War II” exposition for his piece entitled “No Return.” In 1982, the Government of Armenia purchased one of his paintings which still hangs in the Consulate Hall of the main government building in the capital.

American period
In 1987, Martiros migrated to the United States. He sold his works in Laguna Beach, Las Vegas, Miami, and in New York. In 1997, he opened Art Brilliant Gallery on Rodeo Drive in Beverly Hills, California.

Japanese period
Martiros embarked on a journey to Japan, signing a contract with Toyota for a collection of pieces to be commissioned over a five-year period.  He lived in Japan for over 14 years. In 2011 Martiros’ artwork was distributed throughout the region as part of his Asia Tour. Presented by the Damina Gallery in Hong Kong, the tour was sponsored by the International Herald Tribune, the Global Edition of the New York Times.

Style
Over the years, Martiros Manoukian honed his skills in classical painting. He began developing his own unique style of artistic expression at a young age, and further pursued this particular genre of mixed-media painting until he no longer fit any category. His mastery of combining watercolor with oil paint, acrylic, as well as gold and platinum led to the birth of Marmillism: Martiros-Millennial-Ism. Marmillism, coined by the artist himself, as his artworks, which combine Realism, Painterliness, Impressionism and his own blend of mixed-media photo-realism, possess detail and dimension that cannot be attributed to anyone else.

Martiros produces five categories of art: unique original works, original series, original variations, serigraphs with artist retouching and serigraphs.

In 1998, Martiros wrote and published a book captioned, Martiros Manoukian which chronicles his art style and works over the years.

Critical reviews
According to a profile of Martiros in the Feb. 10, 2000 edition of Fine Art Magazine, Martiros’ paintings are “sought after by collectors and prized not only for their surface panache but for their resonating internal power.” The Millennium edition of Fine Art Magazine describes Martiros as “one of an elite few living artists whose 1500 originals have sold worldwide,” as well as “the most successful and saleable living artist in Japan.”

An original painting by Martiros was discussed in 2014 on the syndicated TV program, Pawn Stars. On the show, ASA certified art expert Brett Maly explained:“Just about everything in his artwork pops. It’s all about jumping off the wall in terms of color, in terms of layer and depth. It’s all about the presentation and really creating works that are eye-catching … He has a timeless style … He’s got more staying-power potential than a lot of contemporary artists.”

The April, 2011 edition of Prestige Magazine in Hong Kong noted the artist was: “Acknowledged as A Genius of Fantasy, Armenian-born artist Martiros’ subjects range from portraits and devotional pictures to more abstract motifs.”

Collectors and critics have often compared his artworks to Picasso, Salvador Dalí, Joan Miró and other masters.

See also
 Martiros Saryan
 Martiros
 Soviet art
 Armenian art

References

Living people
1947 births
Soviet emigrants to the United States
Artists from Yerevan
American people of Armenian descent
Soviet artists
Contemporary artists